Fjölsvinnsmál (Old Norse: 'The Lay of Fjölsvinn') is the second of two Old Norse poems commonly published under the title Svipdagsmál "The Lay of Svipdagr". These poems are found together in several 17th-century paper manuscripts with Fjölsvinnsmál. In at least three of these manuscripts, the poems appear in reverse order and are separated by a third eddic poem titled Hyndluljóð. For a long time, the connection between the two poems was not realized, until in 1854 Svend Grundtvig pointed out a connection between the story told in Gróagaldr and the first part of the medieval Scandinavian ballad of Ungen Sveidal/Herr Svedendal/Hertig Silfverdal (TSB A 45, DgF 70, SMB 18, NMB 22). Then in 1856, Sophus Bugge noticed that the last part of the ballad corresponded to Fjölsvinnsmál. Bugge wrote about this connection in Forhandlinger i Videnskabs-Selskabet i Christiania 1860, calling the two poems together Svipdagsmál. Subsequent scholars have accepted this title.

In the first poem, Svipdagr enlists the aid of his dead mother, Gróa, a witch, to assist him in the completion of a task set by his cruel stepmother.

At the commencement of Fjölsvinnsmál, Svipdagr has arrived at a castle on a mountain top. There he encounters a watchman, Fjölsviðr, who tells him to be gone before asking him his name. Svipdagr conceals it, only revealing it later in the poem.

A game of question and answers ensues, wherein Svipdagr learns that Menglöð lives in the castle guarded by Fjölsviðr, and that the castle may not be entered by any save one: Svipdagr. He gives his true name and the gates are opened and Menglöð greets Svipdagr.

The poem is considered to be among the youngest of the Eddic poems. Nevertheless, it is cryptic and some stanzas are corrupt.

References

Bibliography

External links 
Thorpe's translation
Bellows' translation
Eysteinn Björnsson's edition and translation
Guðni Jónsson's edition

Eddic poetry
Sources of Norse mythology